Dorlaithers Castle was a castle about  south-west of Turriff, Aberdeenshire, Scotland at Dorlaithers, south of the burn of Gask.
It may be known alternatively as North Darlaithers.

History
No record of the construction of this castle remains.

Structure
Early records suggest the castle was square; the site is now occupied by a farmhouse.

See also
Castles in Great Britain and Ireland
List of castles in Scotland

References

Castles in Aberdeenshire